John Hatchell (1825 – 7 August 1902) was an Irish Liberal and Whig politician.

He grew up in Terenure, County Dublin. He was the son of John Hatchell of Fortfield House, Terenure, and Elizabeth Waddy, daughter of Richard Waddy of Clougheast Castle. His father was a leading politician and barrister who served as Attorney General for Ireland. Both his parents came from prominent landowning families in  County  Wexford. His sister Mary married as his second wife Maziere Brady, Lord Chancellor of Ireland. Another sister Penelope married John Perrin, one of the many sons of the eminent judge Louis Perrin and was the mother of the artist Mary Perrin.

Hatchell was elected as a Whig Member of Parliament (MP) for County Wexford at the 1857 general election but, standing as a Liberal in 1857, lost the seat at the next election in 1859. Shortly afterwards he was appointed secretary to the Lord Lieutenant of Ireland.

References

External links
 

1825 births
1902 deaths
Whig (British political party) MPs for Irish constituencies
Members of the Parliament of the United Kingdom for County Wexford constituencies (1801–1922)
UK MPs 1857–1859